is a Japanese football player. He currently plays for Shimizu S-Pulse.

Club statistics
Updated to 24 July 2022.

Notes

References

External links

Profile at Tokyo Verdy

1990 births
Living people
Kwansei Gakuin University alumni
Association football people from Hiroshima Prefecture
Japanese footballers
J1 League players
J2 League players
Tokyo Verdy players
Sanfrecce Hiroshima players
Shimizu S-Pulse players
Association football defenders